Brass's friarbird (Philemon brassi) is a species of bird in the family Meliphagidae.
It is endemic to West Papua, Indonesia.

Its natural habitats are subtropical or tropical moist lowland forests and swamps.
It is threatened by habitat loss.

The common name and Latin binomial commemorate the Australian botanist, Leonard J. Brass (1900-1971), who worked for the Queensland Herbarium .

References

Brass's friarbird
Birds of Western New Guinea
Brass's friarbird
Taxa named by Austin L. Rand
Taxonomy articles created by Polbot